HERESIES: A Feminist Publication on Art and Politics was a feminist journal that was produced from 1977 to 1993 by the New York-based Heresies Collective.

History 
HERESIES was a feminist magazine that published from 1977 to 1993, organized by a collective known as the Heresies Collective based in New York City. Each of the 27 issues was collectively edited by a group of volunteers interested in a single topic under the guidance of the "mother collective"; each issue had its own style and perspective.  Subjects included feminist theory, art, politics, patterns of communication, lesbian art and artists, women's traditional arts and crafts, and politics of aesthetics, violence against women, working women, women from peripheral nations, women and music, sex, film, activism, racism, postmodernism, and coming of age.
 
The journal was seen as not only a major contribution to the feminist art scene, but a major forum for feminist thinking that experimented with an editorial format that asked contributors to grapple with hierarchical and societal issues of difference. And it created a public discourse in feminist thought and expression. Initial members of the Heresies Collective included Joan Braderman, Mary Beth Edelson, Elizabeth Hess, Ellen Lanyon, Arlene Ladden, Lucy R. Lippard, Marty Pottenger, Miriam Schapiro and May Stevens. The last issue, LATINA - A Journal of Ideas, was published in 1993.

Voice

Hearing from individual voices was central to the publications overall goal. Being silenced by the patriarchy and anti-feminism movements at the time the women of the publication hoped to use each issue to voice their thoughts on everyday topics and important matters. Each issue was compiled by a different group of women by the Mother Collective. The first issue titled "Feminism, Art, and Politics" provided pages for the women to detail their initial hopes for the magazine and personal thoughts on feminism.

Collectivity 
As individual voices expressed their values within the patriarcal society, a collaborative effort was also valued to show how these women could work as a system to counteract the discrimination they received. The collective functioned as an egalitarian system that abolished the idea of a hierarchy and the idea that some voices were more important than others. In modeling a new structure for working together, Heresies emphasized a cultures that would provide women with real alternatives to the patriarchal structures experienced on a daily basis.

Artistry 
To fully communicate feminist ideologies and individual voices art works and pieces were published within each issue of Heresies. Through their works the women hoped to push back on the prestigious, male dominated art scene at the time. Their artistry also pushed to challenge dominant practices employed by popular magazines at the time. Through inexpensive methods of collaging, sewing, and appliquéing the women allowed themselves full artistic expression and creative freedom. Additionally the artists hoped to reclaim these methods historically assigned to women and deemed as unprofessional.

The art work and pieces created by the women were all hand made both by individuals and through a collaborative effort. Rather than focusing on a finished product, the publication valued the rough, D.I.Y. in order to gain a sense of an artist's process through their work. An inside look into their technique additionally was used to communicate to their audience that anyone is capable of creativity.

Reader Collaboration

Issue fourteen titled "The Women's Pages" marked as unique issue among the history of the publication. One page of the issue was intentionally left blank, encouraging readers to contribute their own works of art and literature. In the editorial statement the collective voiced that the blank page acted as an effort to create a one of a kind issue for each individual. This single page reflected the overall mission of the collective to include all voices and empower their audience. Readers contributing to the page were able to act on their creativity and become a part of the feminist movement.

Controversies
The Mother Collective were a group of women central to overseeing the publication and held responsibility for creating the topics for each issue. The collective recruited specific writers and artists they felt could carry out and address the concerning subject. However through their leadership role these women were often called out for their lack of diversity in comprising only white women.

The concern for the lack of diversity was initially ignited after the publication of the third issue “Lesbian Art and Artists”. The issue was published in 1977 and was praised for creating a safe space in allowing women to express their sexuality through their work. Enduring homophobia and marginalization from the hegemonic heterosexual culture the issue provided a platform lesbian women were otherwise unable to have. As a preliminary statement the issue included an acknowledgment of their biases,"We are all lesbians, white, college-educated, and mostly middle class women who live in New York and have a background in the arts".

Regardless, the issue received criticism for failing to include lesbian artists of color. Combahee River Collective, a black feminist organization, wrote the all-white editorial group demanding the oversight be addressed. The letter was published by the Heresies Collective as a gesture of accountability. Additionally, to be more inclusive and focus on the subject of race, Heresies published the issues "Third World Women" and "Racism is the Issue". However, their initial lack of intersectionality in "Lesbian Art and Artists" remained as a major fault throughout the history of the publication.

Members of the Mother Collective 
Around nineteen women were founders:
Joan Braderman
Mary Beth Edelson
Harmony Hammond
Elizabeth Hess
Joyce Kozloff
Arlene Ladden
Lucy Lippard
Mary Miss
Marty Pottenger
Miriam Schapiro
Joan Snyder
Elke Solomon
Pat Steir
May Stevens
Michelle Stuart
Susana Torre
Elizabeth Weatherford
Sally Webster
Nina Yankowitz

See also
 Feminist art movement in the United States
 Feminist art criticism
The Heretics

References

Further reading

External links
Heresies: A Feminist Publication on Art and Politics, archive of past issues
Heresies: A Feminist Publication on Art and Politics, collection on archive.org
"The Heretics." MoMA documentary
"Synopsis: The Heretics." 
Issue 14

Defunct political magazines published in the United States
Feminism in the United States
Feminist magazines
Magazines established in 1977
Magazines disestablished in 1993
Magazines published in New York City
Visual arts magazines published in the United States